The Cucuiș is a right tributary of the river Sibișel in Romania. It flows into the Sibișel near Căstău.

References

Rivers of Romania
Rivers of Hunedoara County